Events from the year 1968 in France were categorized by protests and general unrest across the country as part of the many protests of 1968 that occurred across the globe in that year.

Incumbents
 President: Charles de Gaulle 
 Prime Minister: Georges Pompidou (until 10 July), Maurice Couve de Murville (starting 10 July)

Events
27 January – French submarine sinks in the Mediterranean with 52 men on board.
22 March – Daniel Cohn-Bendit and seven other students occupy Administrative offices of the University of Nanterre, setting in motion a chain of events that will lead France to the brink of revolution in May.
23 April – surgeons at the Hôpital de la Pitié, Paris, perform Europe's first heart transplant operation.
May – student strike in May and June developed into widespread and unprecedented protests over poor working conditions and a rigid educational system, which threatened to bring down the government.
30 May – Georges Pompidou is returned as Prime Minister following general election, but – largely due to the widespread protests of May and June, it lasts for a mere 42 days before president Charles de Gaulle dismisses him and calls a new election.
23 June – Legislative Election held.
30 June – Legislative Election held.
10 July – In the second election, Maurice Couve de Murville is elected as Prime Minister.
24 August – France explodes its first hydrogen bomb, thus becoming the world's fifth nuclear power.
11 September – Air France Flight 1611 crashed into the Mediterranean off Nice, killing all 95 on board.
12 September – Launch of the Peugeot 504, successor the 404, available as a four-door five-seater saloon or five-door seven-seater estate, both with rear-wheel drive.
The island of Moruroa (then known as Mururoa) in French Polynesia was used for French nuclear tests twice during the year (in August and September) leading to widespread protest from other Pacific nations.
René Cassin wins the Nobel Prize for Peace.

Arts and literature
Singer Dalida releases the singles "Le Temps des Fleurs", "Je m'endors dans tes bras", and "Si j'avais des millions".

Sport
6 February – 18 February – The 1968 Winter Olympics takes place in Grenoble. The host nation finishes third on the medal table with four gold, three silver, and two bronze medals.
27 June – Tour de France begins.
7 July – French Grand Prix is won by Jacky Ickx in a Ferrari.
21 July – Tour de France ends, won by Jan Janssen of the Netherlands.
28–29 September – In the 24 hours of Le Mans motor race, the team of Pedro Rodríguez and Lucien Bianchi wins driving a Ford GT-40.
In horse racing, the Prix de l'Arc de Triomphe is won by Vaguely Noble.
Jean-Claude Killy is men's overall alpine skiing world champion.
The French Tennis Open is won by Ken Rosewall (men) and Nancy Richey (women).
AS Saint-Étienne won the football double of Ligue 1 and Coupe de France.

Births

January to March
3 January – Gérald Mossé, jockey.
9 January – Franck Dumas, soccer player, manager.
11 January – Philippe Cavoret, skeleton racer.
21 January – Sébastien Lifshitz, screenwriter and director.
22 January – Frank Leboeuf, international soccer player.
27 January – Patrick Blondeau, soccer player.
28 January – Mathilde Seigner, actress.
4 February – Éric Sikora, soccer player.
6 February – Patrick Lemarié, motor racing driver.
9 February – Pascal Chanteur, cyclist.
9 February – Frédéric Meyrieu, cyclist.
10 February – Stéphane Pounewatchy, soccer player, agent.
13 February – Fabrice Henry, soccer player.
17 February – Jérôme Gnako, soccer player.
25 February – Sandrine Kiberlain, actress.
28 February – Éric Le Chanony, bobsledder and Olympic medallist.
1 March – Vincent Ribeton, Catholic priest and seminary rector.
9 March – Youri Djorkaeff, international soccer player.
18 March – Christophe Pinna, karateka.
23 March – Pierre Palmade, actor and comedian.
26 March – Laurent Brochard, cyclist.
28 March – Alain Caveglia, soccer player.

April to June
3 April – Philippe Rombi, film score composer.
5 April – Serge Vaudenay, cryptographer.
7 April – Christophe Ohrel, soccer player.
9 April – Marie-Claire Restoux, judoka and Olympic gold medallist.
13 April – Jeanne Balibar, actress.
9 May – Marie-José Pérec, athlete and Olympic gold medallist.
10 May – Thomas Coville, yachtsman.
17 May – Constance Menard, dressage rider and equestrienne.
28 May – Pascal Pierre, soccer player.
4 June – Sandrine Fricot, high jumper.
6 June – Dominique Boeuf, jockey.

July to September
6 July – Sylvain Guillaume, nordic combined skier and Olympic medallist.
10 July – Frédéric Kuhn, hammer thrower.
22 July – Thierry Brusseau, athlete.
23 July – Jean-Marc Chanelet, soccer player.
30 July – Gilles Maignan, cyclist.
3 August – Christophe Bordeau, swimmer and Olympic medallist.
5 August – Marine Le Pen, politician.
23 August – Franck Rolling, soccer player.
1 September – Franck Lagorce, motor racing driver.
3 September – Christophe Mengin, cyclist.
7 September – Marcel Desailly, soccer player.
10 September – Florence Devouard, former Chair of the Board of Trustees of the Wikimedia Foundation.
22 September – Pascal Fugier, soccer player.
23 September – Stéphane Mahé, soccer player, manager.
26 September – Frédéric Moncassin, cyclist.
30 September – Hervé Renard, soccer player, manager.

October to December
5 October
Alexandre de Betak, fashion and furniture designer.
Xavier Gravelaine, soccer player, manager.
6 October – Dominique A, songwriter and singer.
15 October – Didier Deschamps, soccer player.
28 October – François Simon, cyclist.
30 October – Emmanuelle Claret, biathlete. (died 2013)
9 November – Pascal Pons, percussionist.
27 November – Michael Vartan, actor.
30 November – Laurent Jalabert, cyclist.
8 December – Philippe Katerine, singer.
10 December – Denis Langlois, race walker.
11 December
Emmanuelle Charpentier, researcher in microbiology, genetics and biochemistry
Fabien Lévy, composer.
12 December – Rodolphe Gilbert, tennis player.
17 December – Fabrice Neaud, comic artist.
30 December – Fabrice Guy, nordic combined skier and Olympic gold medallist.

Full date unknown
Marc Fleury, software designer.
Christophe Godin, guitarist.
Hervé Paillet, actor and painter.
Stéphane Pompougnac, House DJ, musician, composer and producer.

Deaths

January to March
9 January – Louis Aubert, composer (born 1877).
18 January – Gribouille, singer (born 1941).
4 February – Jean Gachet, boxer and Olympic medallist (born 1894).
5 February – Paul Marie André Richaud, Cardinal (born 1887).
8 February 
 Maurice Maillot, actor (born 1906)
 René Navarre, actor (born 1877).
14 February – Pierre Veuillot, Cardinal (born 1913).
6 March – Léon Mathot, actor and film director (born 1886).
17 March – Jules Basdevant, law professor (born 1877).
24 March – Alice Guy-Blaché, pioneer filmmaker, first female film director (born 1873).

April to June
15 May – Gilbert Gérintès, rugby union player (born 1902).
31 May
Abel Bonnard, poet, novelist and politician (born 1883).
Paul Marchandeau, politician and Minister (born 1882).
11 June – Jean-Julien Lemordant, artist and soldier (born 1882).
17 June – Adolphe Mouron Cassandre, painter, commercial poster artist and typeface designer (born 1901).
27 June – Léon Poirier, film director, screenwriter and film producer (born 1884).

July to September
8 July – Désiré Mérchez, swimmer, water polo player and Olympic medallist (born 1882).
21 July – Robert Péguy, film director (born 1883).
10 August – Gabriel Hanot, soccer player and journalist (born 1889).
14 August – Marcel Thil, world champion boxer (born 1904).
2 September – André Girard, painter, poster-maker and Resistance member (born 1901).
11 September – René Cogny, General (born 1904).
17 September – Armand Blanchonnet, cyclist and Olympic gold medallist (born 1903).
September – Pierre Grany, athlete (born 1899).

October to December
2 October – Marcel Duchamp, artist (born 1887).
9 October – Jean Paulhan, writer, literary critic and publisher (born 1884).
25 October – Jean Schlumberger, writer and journalist (born 1877).
6 November – Charles Münch, conductor and violinist (born 1891).
11 November – Jeanne Demessieux, organist, pianist, composer and teacher (born 1921).
25 November – Marcel Labey, conductor and composer (born 1875).
28 November – Jean Delsarte, mathematician (born 1903).
3 December – Lucien Callamand, actor (born 1888).
7 December – Pierre Jaminet, cyclist (born 1912).

Full date unknown
Jean Hyppolite, philosopher (born 1907).
André Prudhommeaux, anarchist bookstore owner (born 1902).

See also
 List of French films of 1968

References

1960s in France